Ney Pahn-e Abdollah (also Romanized as Ney Pahn-e ‘Abdollāh; also known as Naşrābād Seyyed Aḩmad, Pahn Abdollāh, Saīyīd Ahmad, and Seyyed Aḩmad) is a village in Nasrabad Rural District (Kermanshah Province), in the Central District of Qasr-e Shirin County, Kermanshah Province, Iran. At the 2006 census, its population was 36, in 9 families.

References 

Populated places in Qasr-e Shirin County